Salman Fayyaz (born 11 August 1997) is a Pakistani cricketer. He made his first-class debut for Lahore Whites in the 2017–18 Quaid-e-Azam Trophy on 26 September 2017. Prior to his first-class debut, he was named in Pakistan's squad for the 2016 Under-19 Cricket World Cup.

References

External links
 

1997 births
Living people
Pakistani cricketers
Place of birth missing (living people)
Lahore Whites cricketers